Elshod Rasulov (born March 7, 1986 in Kokand, Uzbek SSR) is an amateur boxer from Uzbekistan, who won gold at the 2006 Asian Games and at the 2010 Asian Games and silver at 2009 World Amateur Boxing Championships.

Career
In 2004 the southpaw counterpuncher knocked out Emilio Correa in the welterweight finals of the 13th World Junior Championships in Jeju then he moved up to middleweight.

That year, he won the silver medal at the 48th World Military Boxing Championship in the 69 kg weight class. The gold was won by Boyd Melson of the US.

At the Chemiepokal 2006 he beat Sergiy Derevyanchenko (UKR) but lost to world #1 Matvey Korobov.  In Doha at the 2006 Asian Games he won the final bout against Kazakhstan's Olympic welterweight champion Bakhtiyar Artayev 32–22.

At the 2007 World Championships he lost by knock out to Argenis Casimiro Núñez and didn't medal.

He qualified for the 2008 Olympics by defeating two unknown opponents from Syria and Japan even though he was KOd in one round by Thai Angkhan Chomphuphuang at the qualifier. In Beijing he beat Jean-Mickaël Raymond and Andranik Hakobyan, but lost to old foe Emilio Correa.  Afterwards he moved up to light heavy.

At the 2009 World Amateur Boxing Championships he beat Abdelkader Bouhenia (FRA) in the semis, then lost to Artur Beterbiyev.

At the 2010 Asian Games he won again.

At the 2011 World Amateur Boxing Championships he lost to Adilbek Niyazymbetov (KAZ) and won Bronze.

At the 2012 Olympics (results) he defeated Yahia El-Mekachari then lost to Russian favorite Egor Mekhontsev 15:19.

References

External links
 
 
 
 
 World Juniors 2004 at amateur-boxing.strefa.pl
 Qualifier at amateur-boxing.strefa.pl

1986 births
Living people
People from Kokand
Boxers at the 2008 Summer Olympics
Boxers at the 2012 Summer Olympics
Boxers at the 2016 Summer Olympics
Olympic boxers of Uzbekistan
Asian Games medalists in boxing
Boxers at the 2006 Asian Games
Boxers at the 2010 Asian Games
Uzbekistani male boxers
AIBA World Boxing Championships medalists
Asian Games gold medalists for Uzbekistan
Medalists at the 2006 Asian Games
Medalists at the 2010 Asian Games
Universiade medalists in boxing
Universiade bronze medalists for Uzbekistan
Middleweight boxers
Medalists at the 2013 Summer Universiade
21st-century Uzbekistani people